6-phosphofructo-2-kinase/fructose-2,6-biphosphatase 4 also known as PFKFB4 is an enzyme which in humans is encoded by the PFKFB4 gene.

Function 

The bifunctional 6-phosphofructo-2-kinase/fructose-2,6-bisphosphatase (PFKFB) regulates the steady-state concentration of fructose 2,6-bisphosphate, an activator of a key regulatory enzyme of glycolysis, phosphofructokinase.

In 2012 research by scientists at Cancer Research UK’s London Research Institute show that an enzyme called PFKFB4 is essential for balancing these two processes – making sure the cell’s energy needs are met without allowing free radicals to build up and trigger cell death.
Study leader Dr. Almut Schulze, said: “Our study suggests that PFKFB4 acts to fine-tune the process by which cells convert glucose into energy. Blocking this enzyme in prostate cancer cells grown in the lab stalled growth and triggered a catastrophic build-up of free-radicals, suggesting that it could be a suitable drug target. Importantly, this route to energy production is common to many different types of cancer, suggesting that drugs to target it could potentially be used to treat a variety of cancers.”

References

Further reading